This is a list of New York Americans head coaches. The Americans had nine different head coaches during the team's existence. Tommy Gorman is the most successful head coach in team's history, accumulating a .488 winning percentage during two stints as head coach. Red Dutton is the longest-tenured head coach for the team and lead the Americans to the Stanley Cup playoffs in three seasons.

Key

Coaches

Notes

 The win–loss percentage is calculated using the formula:

References

External links
 New York Americans coaches at Hockey-Reference.com

 
New York Americans
Ice hockey-related lists